Street Rats was the eighth studio album by the English rock group Humble Pie, released in 1975. The album went to number 100 on the US Billboard 200 album chart.

Background
Street Rats was created at the same time as Steve Marriott was producing a solo album, and a collaboration album with Greg Ridley.  He was not keen on producing another Humble Pie album, and did not want to tour the U.S. again, as they had been touring solidly for the past four years.

While on the road, everything they wanted was paid for, but once they got back to England, four years and 21 tours later there was no money in the bank.  Understandably, they were loath to tour and promote another album.  Marriott: "We'd been on tour for about four years, and we were just very tired".  But A&M as well as manager Dee Anthony were able to insist that Humble Pie were contracted to do another tour, and to do so without another album would have been an unwise move by the band.

In early 1975, the record company, tired of waiting for the new album, "confiscated" material from Marriott's Clear Sounds Studio, but much of the material was not meant for Humble Pie, it was for a solo album and for his on-going project with Ridley.  To make the best of a bad situation, A&M brought in Andrew Loog Oldham to mix and cut up the tracks and make them heavier, much to the disgust of Marriott. The title Street Rats was also thought up by A&M.  Not surprisingly the band were never happy with the album, with  Ridley saying: "It was terrible".  Clem Clempson elaborated on this. "The mixes were done by someone outside the band, [Oldham], and when we heard it we were horrified". Marriott (1975): " "Street Rats" was a track with me, Ian Wallace and Tim Hinkley playing piano, It was nothing to do with Humble Pie".    "Somebody stole the 16-track mix [ ] It was intended as the title track for my album".

The album has different mixes for the US version.  The UK version also has the track "Funky to the Bone" in place of "There 'Tis", Marriott stated in an interview that the song had nothing to do with Humble Pie. "It was just musicians up in my studio!" 
  
Five of the albums' eleven songs are covers; "Rain", "We Can Work it Out" and "Drive My Car" from The Beatles; "Rock and Roll Music" by Chuck Berry and "Let Me Be Your Lovemaker" by Reid/Clark/Wright and originally recorded by R&B artist Betty Wright in 1973.  There are two song written by Marriott, "Street Rats" and "Road Hog".  The remaining three are collaborations between the various band members.

The album was produced by Loog Oldham and Marriott; it was recorded in Olympic Studios and Marriott's Clean Sounds studio at his home in Essex, England.

The last word on the album by Ridley: "Humble Pie were better than that, but we were not really consulted."

After the release of this album and their farewell tour, Humble Pie disbanded, citing musical differences.  Marriott went on to produce his first solo album Marriott and promptly moved back to the UK.

Track listing 
 "Street Rat" (Steve Marriott) - 2:52   (Lead Vocal: Steve) (Drums: Ian Wallace)
 "Rock and Roll Music" (Chuck Berry) - 2:55 (Lead Vocal: Greg)
 "We Can Work It Out" (John Lennon, Paul McCartney) - 3:18 (Lead Vocal: Steve)
 "Scored Out" (Clem Clempson, Marriott) - 2:43 (Lead Vocal: Steve)
 "Road Hog" (Marriott) - 3:08 (Lead Vocal: Steve)
 "Rain" (Lennon, McCartney) - 5:58 (Lead Vocals: Steve and Greg)
 "There 'Tis" (Marriott, Clempson) - 3:06 (Lead Vocal: Steve)
 "Let Me Be Your Lovemaker" (Clarence Reid, Willie Clarke, Betty Wright) - 5:57 (Lead Vocal: Greg)
 "Countryman Stomp" (Greg Ridley, Clempson, Tim Hinkley) - 2:20 (Lead Vocal: Greg)
 "Drive My Car" (Lennon, McCartney) - 3:43 (Lead Vocal: Greg)
 "Queens and Nuns" (Clempson, Marriott, Ridley, Jerry Shirley) - 3:04 (Lead Vocal: Steve)

Personnel
Humble Pie
 Steve Marriott – guitar, harmonica, keyboards, vocals, producer
 Clem Clempson – guitar, slide guitar
 Greg Ridley – bass guitar, vocals
 Jerry Shirley – all drums except on "Street Rat"

Additional personnel
 Mel Collins – saxophones
 Tim Hinkley – keyboards
 Ian Wallace – drums on "Street Rat"

Tour

References

External links
Information on Humble Pie

Humble Pie (band) albums
1975 albums
Albums produced by Andrew Loog Oldham
Albums produced by Steve Marriott
A&M Records albums
Albums recorded at Olympic Sound Studios
Albums recorded in a home studio